The Caps Brothers Manufacturing Company was a very short lived car company in 1905 that was taken over by the Kansas City Motor Car Company, which made cars and trucks from 1905 to 1909 before briefly becoming the Wonder Motor Car Company which made the 1909 Kansas City Wonder car. No examples of any Caps Brothers,  Kansas City, or Wonder cars or trucks are known to exist today.

The Caps Car
The Caps car was available in two body styles; two-seat runabout and tonneau. The gas powered engine produced 14 horsepower.

See also
Kansas City Motor Car Company
Wonder Motor Car Company
List of defunct automobile manufacturers of the United States
List of automobile manufacturers of the United States
Brass Era car
History of the automobile
History of the Kansas City metropolitan area

References

Brass Era vehicles
Vehicle manufacturing companies established in 1905
Defunct motor vehicle manufacturers of the United States
Companies based in Missouri
Defunct companies based in Missouri
Manufacturing companies based in Kansas City, Missouri
Motor vehicle assembly plants in Missouri
1905 establishments in Missouri

Motor vehicle manufacturers based in Missouri